HMP may refer to:

Science and technology
 Haughton–Mars Project
 Host media processing, a telephony processing technique
 Human Microbiome Project
 Harmonic mean p-value, a technique for combining statistical tests

Computing
 Heterogeneous multi-processing, internal use model of the ARM big.LITTLE architecture
 Host Monitoring Protocol, an obsolete TCP/IP protocol

Other uses
 h.m.p. (Japan), a Japanese adult video company
 Hampton railway station (London), London, National Rail station code
 HM Prison, His/Her Majesty's Prison
 Northern Mashan Miao language, ISO 639-3 code
 Tommy Suharto (Hutomo Mandala Putra, abberivated HMP), Indonesian politician and businessman, youngest son of former Indonesian president Suharto